Yves Belle-Belle (born 8 June 1973) is a Cameroonian former professional footballer who played as a forward.

Belle-Belle won seven caps for the Cameroon national team and scored three goals. He made his debut in 1989 in a World Cup qualifier against Gabon. Second, he scored Cameroon's only goal in the 6–1 away defeat to Norway in October 1990. He then scored again in a 1992 African Cup of Nations qualification 1–1 draw against Sierra Leone.

On the club level he featured for HNK Rijeka in the 1995–96 season, Malaysian outfit Melaka United in 1998–99 and German minnows TSF Ditzingen in 1999–2000.

References

1973 births
Living people
People from Yaoundé
Cameroonian footballers
Association football forwards
Cameroon international footballers
HNK Rijeka players
Melaka United F.C. players
TSF Ditzingen players
Cameroonian expatriate footballers
Expatriate footballers in Croatia
Cameroonian expatriate sportspeople in Croatia
Expatriate footballers in Malaysia
Cameroonian expatriate sportspeople in Malaysia
Expatriate footballers in Germany
Cameroonian expatriate sportspeople in Germany